The following table outlines the COVID-19 clusters detected in Australia from the start of the pandemic until 5 November 2021, when Australia entered the consolidation phase of its COVID-19 transition plan by reaching an 80 percent vaccination target of the eligible Australian population. COVID-19 clusters are cases that are known to be related by close contacts. A single cluster may have cases in multiple locations. Some smaller clusters are known to be linked to larger clusters. A cluster may be investigated for days before being announced for the first time. The table may include clusters that originated after 5 November 2021, however, these are a narrow rather than a near-exhaustive subset of the total clusters in the Australian community.

The table uses a combination of reporting from official state and territory government publications as well as media sources where appropriate. Reporting from state and territory governments has varied depending on the severity of outbreaks, as larger periods of community transmission makes it less practical to provide details on every outbreak. The Victorian Government did not report breakdowns of individual clusters on 10 July 2020 due to widespread community transmission becoming entrenched in the Melbourne metropolitan area. On 8 September 2020, the Victoria Government published numbers relating to all aged care clusters. The NSW Government significantly scaled down reporting of individual clusters on 10 July 2021 due to the widespread community transmission in the Sydney metropolitan area. Additionally, the Victorian government scaled down their daily reporting on individual clusters on 21 August 2021; as a result the highest concurrent active case numbers may be cited for some clusters in the absence of complete case numbers.

Furthermore, apart from instances that a cluster has particular notoriety, the table does not regularly report on clusters originating from jurisdictions once their government abandoned a COVID-zero target, as clusters become too numerous and their reporting becomes significantly less comprehensive. This occurred in New South Wales in mid-August 2021 and Victoria on 1 September 2021. On 14 September 2021, while not officially abandoning a COVID-zero target, the ACT government conceded it was unlikely that COVID-19 would be eliminated from the territory.

See also 
 COVID-19 (Coronavirus disease 2019)
 COVID-19 pandemic
 COVID-19 pandemic in Australia
 COVID-19 pandemic in Australia (timeline)
 COVID-19 vaccination in Australia
 Biosecurity in Australia
 National Cabinet of Australia
 National COVID-19 Coordination Commission
 National Security Committee (Australia)
 Coronavirus Australia
 Xenophobia and racism related to the COVID-19 pandemic#Australia

Notes

References 

COVID-19 pandemic in Australia
Australia